Maurice Black (January 14, 1891 – January 18, 1938) was an American character actor known for his portrayal of mobsters. He appeared in more than 100 films from 1928 to 1938, when he died of pneumonia, four days after his 47th birthday. He was married to Edythe Raynore.

Selected filmography
Captain Swagger (1928) – Manager, Viennese Club (uncredited)
Show Folks (1928) – Vaudeville Performer
Marked Money (1928) – Donovan
Romance of the Underworld (1928) – Maitre D' (uncredited)
The Carnation Kid (1929) – Tony
 Square Shoulders (1929) – Hook
Broadway Babies (1929) – Nick Stepanos
Dark Streets (1929) – Beefy Barker
Song of Love (1929) – Tony Giuseppe (uncredited)
Playing Around (1930) – Joe
Street of Chance (1930) – Nick
Framed (1930) – Bing Murdock
Show Girl in Hollywood (1930) – Actor in Scene (uncredited)
The Runaway Bride (1930) – 'Red' Dugan (uncredited)
True to the Navy (1930) – Sharpie (uncredited)
Numbered Men (1930) – Lou Rinaldo
Common Clay (1930) – Speakeasy Proprietor (uncredited)
Abraham Lincoln (1930) – Conspirator (uncredited)
The Sea God (1930) – Rudy
Brothers (1930) – Giuseppe Michaelo Lorenzo
Renegades (1930) – Cafe Manager (uncredited)
Big Money (1930) – Lewis Wilder
Little Caesar (1931) – Little Arnie Lorch
No Limit (1931) – Happy
Lonely Wives (1931) – Taxi Driver
Sit Tight (1931) – Mr. White (uncredited)
The Front Page (1931) – Diamond Louie
The Spy (1931) – Commissar
Smart Money (1931) – Greek Barber
Women Go on Forever (1931) – Pete
Sob Sister (1931) – Gimp Peters (uncredited)
Stung (1931, Short) – The Accused
Stowaway (1932) – Minor Role
Dancers in the Dark (1932) – Max
Steady Company (1932) – Blix
Scarface (1932) – Jim – Headwaiter (uncredited)
Symphony of Six Million (1932) – Felix's Patient (uncredited)
While Paris Sleeps (1932) – Roca
The Famous Ferguson Case (1932) – Kaplan (scenes deleted)
The Strange Love of Molly Louvain (1932) – Nicky's Pal (uncredited)
The King Murder (1932) – Philip Scott
Tiger Shark (1932) – Jean Fernandez – a Shipwrecked Crewman (uncredited)
The All American (1932) – Blackie Doyle
The Face on the Barroom Floor (1932) – Cesar Vanzetti
Rasputin and the Empress (1932) – Revolutionary Soldier (uncredited)
Grand Slam (1933) – Paul (uncredited)
Blondie Johnson (1933) – Tony (uncredited)
The Keyhole (1933) – Cuban Jewelry Salesman (uncredited)
The Cohens and Kellys in Trouble (1933) – Nick (uncredited)
Elmer, the Great (1933) – Dice Dealer (uncredited)
Picture Snatcher (1933) – Speakeasy Proprietor (uncredited)
I Cover the Waterfront (1933) – Ortegus
A Shriek in the Night (1933) – Josephus Martini (uncredited)
Her First Mate (1933) – Boat Extra on Steps (uncredited)
 Ship of Wanted Men (1933) – George Spinoli
Night Flight (1933) – Nightclub Manager (uncredited)
Tillie and Gus (1933) – Bit Part (uncredited)
Murder on the Campus (1933) – Blackie Atwater
Twin Husbands (1933) – Feets
Flying Down to Rio (1933) – One of the Three Greeks #2
Sixteen Fathoms Deep (1934) – Nick – Henhman / Crewman
Half a Sinner (1934) – Mike
Friends of Mr. Sweeney (1934) – Pierre, the Headwaiter (uncredited)
The Party's Over (1934) – Proprietor of Sweet Shop (uncredited)
Down to Their Last Yacht (1934) – Joe Spilatti (uncredited)
Gift of Gab (1934) – Audition Room Owner (uncredited)
Wake Up and Dream (1934) – Tom Romero
The Mighty Barnum (1934) – Imposter (uncredited)
West of the Pecos (1934) – Shorty Evans
Bride of Frankenstein (1935) – Gypsy (uncredited)
Under the Pampas Moon (1935) – Patron (uncredited)
The Daring Young Man (1935) – Florist (uncredited)
Orchids to You (1935) – Flower Seller (uncredited)
The Crusades (1935) – Amir (uncredited)
Bonnie Scotland (1935) – Khan Mir Jutra
The Last Days of Pompeii (1935) – Attendant in Gladiators' Training Room (uncredited)
Stars Over Broadway (1935) – Jim Flugel (uncredited)
Exclusive Story (1936) – Martinello (uncredited)
Laughing Irish Eyes (1936) – Tony Martin
Silly Billies (1936) – Bandit with Toothache (uncredited)
A Son Comes Home (1936) – Greek Sailor (uncredited)
Missing Girls (1936) – Miller
Ellis Island (1936) – Nails
Under Strange Flags  (1937) – General Pancho Villa
Three Legionnaires (1937) – Gen. Stavinski's aide
The Californian (1937) – Pancho
The Life of Emile Zola (1937) – Minor Role (uncredited)
The Firefly (1937) – Pigeon Vendor (uncredited)
The Game That Kills (1937) – Jeff
Adventure's End (1937) – Blackie
Walking Down Broadway (1938) – Norton (uncredited) (final film role)

External links

American male film actors
1938 deaths
1891 births
20th-century American male actors
Burials at Hollywood Forever Cemetery
People from Queens, New York
Male actors from New York City
Deaths from pneumonia in California